The 2004 Copa Perú season, the promotion tournament of Peruvian football.

The tournament has 5 stages. The first four stages are played as mini-league round-robin tournaments, except for third stage in region IV, which is played as a knockout stage. The final stage features two knockout rounds and a final four-team group stage to determine the two promoted teams.

The 2004 Peru Cup started with the District Stage on February. The next stage was the Provincial Stage which started, on June. The tournament continued with the Departamental Stage on July. The Regional Staged followed. The National Stage started on November. The winner  of the National Stage will be promoted to the First Division.

Departmental Stage
The following list shows the teams that qualified for the Regional Stage.

Regional Stage
The following list shows the teams that qualified for the Regional Stage.

Region I
Region I includes qualified teams from Amazonas, Lambayeque, Tumbes and Piura region.

Quarterfinals

Semifinals

Region II
Region II includes qualified teams from Ancash, Cajamarca, La Libertad and San Martín region.

Group A

Group B

Final

Region III
Region III includes qualified teams from Huanuco, Junin and Pasco region.

Region IV
Region IV includes qualified teams from Ayacucho, Huancavelica and Ica region.

Region V
Region V includes qualified teams from Callao, Lima, Loreto and Ucayali region.

Group A

Group B

Semifinals

Final

Region VI
This region is the 2004 Segunda División

Qualify for Etapa Nacional:
 Olímpico Somos Perú
 Deportivo Municipal

Region VII
Region VII includes qualified teams from Arequipa, Moquegua and Tacna region.

Group A

Group B

Final

Region VIII
Region VIII includes qualified teams from Apurímac, Cusco, Madre de Dios and Puno region.

Group A

Group B

Semifinals

Final

National Stage
The National Stage started in November. The winners of the National Stage will be promoted to the First Division.

Tiebreaker

External links
  Copa Peru 2004

Copa Perú seasons
2004 domestic association football cups
2004 in Peruvian football